If You Could See What I Hear is a 1982 Canadian biographical drama film about blind musician Tom Sullivan, starring Marc Singer and Shari Belafonte, directed by Eric Till.

Plot summary
Tom Sullivan (Marc Singer) is a blind college student who wants to be normal. When not in class, Tom hangs out with his friend, Will Sly (R. H. Thomson), who does not treat him like a blind person. In fact, he goes out of his way to challenge Tom. Tom likes to go jogging while Will leads him on his bicycle. Will leads him past obstacles such as park benches, shouting out "Bench!" at the last moment so Tom has to jump over it.

On campus, Tom meets a black woman named Heather Johnson (Shari Belafonte), with whom he falls in love. But she breaks off the relationship because "the black and white thing," coupled with Tom's blindness, is too complicated for her. Crushed by Heather's abandonment and experiencing loneliness, Tom continues to struggle with himself, still denying that his blindness affects his "normalcy". Then he meets his future wife, Patti Steffen (Sarah Torgov), and his life changes irreversibly.

The movie is most famous for the scene where while Tom is on the phone with someone, his stepdaughter, Blythe, falls in their indoor pool and nearly drowns, and he, upon realizing she is missing, manages to find her at the bottom of the pool and save her life.

Cast
Marc Singer ... Tom Sullivan
R. H. Thomson ... Will Sly
Shari Belafonte ... Heather Johnson
Harvey Atkin ... Bert
Helen Burns ... Mrs. Ruxton
Douglas Campbell ... Porky Sullivan
David Gardner ... Jack Steffen
Nonnie Griffin ... Mrs. Steffen
Sharon Lewis ... Helga
Adrienne Pocock ... Blythe Steffen
Sarah Torgov ... Patti Steffen 
Greer Forward ... Stunt Double for Blythe Steffen (uncredited)

Reception
The film was critically panned. Roger Ebert pointed out that the film was intended to be "inspirational and uplifting" and stated that Sullivan "comes across in this movie like a refugee from Animal House. His idea of overcoming his handicap is to party all night." He and Gene Siskel selected the film as one of the worst of the year in a 1982 episode of Sneak Previews.

References

External links

 
 

1982 films
Canadian biographical drama films
1980s biographical drama films
Films about blind people
Canadian independent films
English-language Canadian films
Films scored by Eric Robertson (composer)
Films directed by Eric Till
1982 independent films
1982 drama films
1980s English-language films
1980s Canadian films